Wileville  is a community in the Canadian province of Nova Scotia, located in the Lunenburg Municipal District in Lunenburg County.

Wileville is named after the Wile family, whose name is still prominent in the area today.

References
Wileville on Destination Nova Scotia

Communities in Lunenburg County, Nova Scotia
General Service Areas in Nova Scotia